Zdravko Kovačević (Serbian Cyrillic: Здравко Ковачевић; born 6 August 1984) is a Serbian football defender.

Career
In his career, he played for Serbian football clubs Banat Zrenjanin, Hajduk Beograd and Radnički Nova Pazova, and he had 1 appearance for Zbrojovka Brno in Czech Gambrinus Liga.

Statistics

References

1984 births
Living people
Serbian footballers
Association football defenders
FK Banat Zrenjanin players
FK Hajduk Beograd players
FK Radnički Nova Pazova players
Serbian SuperLiga players
OFK Beograd players
FC Zbrojovka Brno players
Czech First League players